Mesnil-Panneville is a commune in the Seine-Maritime department in the Normandy region in northern France.

Geography

Population

Places of interest
 The church of Notre-Dame, dating from the nineteenth century.
 The chapel of St. Antoine, dating from the twelfth century.
 The sixteenth century chateau de Panneville.
 The Château d'Hardouville, with parts dating from feudal times.
 A sixteenth-century house with a sculpted chimney.
 The church of Notre-Dame at Durecy, dating from the nineteenth century.
 The church of St.Sulpice, dating from the thirteenth century.

See also
Communes of the Seine-Maritime department

References

Communes of Seine-Maritime